William Trevor Lawrence (born October 6, 1999) is an American football quarterback for the Jacksonville Jaguars of the National Football League (NFL). Considered among the highest-touted college football prospects, he won the 2019 National Championship Game as a freshman at Clemson University and set the school's record for quarterback wins. Selected first overall by the Jaguars in the 2021 NFL Draft, Lawrence had a breakout season in 2022 when he led the Jaguars to their first division title and playoff win since 2017.

Early years

William Trevor Lawrence was born in Knoxville, Tennessee on October 6, 1999. He later attended Cartersville High School in Cartersville, Georgia, where he played football and basketball. As a junior in 2016, he was The Atlanta Journal-Constitution player of the year after completing 250 of 406 passes for 3,904 yards and 51 touchdowns. As a sophomore, he passed for 3,655 yards and 43 touchdowns and as a freshman had 3,042 yards and 26 touchdowns.

From his sophomore year to his senior year, Lawrence led the Purple Hurricanes to 41 straight victories, winning two state championships and four region titles while also receiving numerous national high school player of the year honors. In 2017, Lawrence broke the Georgia state record for passing yards and passing touchdowns, which were previously held by Deshaun Watson of Gainesville, who also played for Clemson.

Lawrence was a five-star recruit who was regarded as one of the best high school quarterback prospects of all time. On December 16, 2016, he committed to Clemson University to play college football.

College career

Freshman year

Lawrence started his freshman season behind Kelly Bryant on Clemson's depth chart, but was given equal playing time in the season's first games. Head coach Dabo Swinney named Lawrence the new starter after four games, after which Bryant announced his intention to transfer schools. Lawrence led Clemson to an undefeated regular season, a 42–10 victory over Pittsburgh in the ACC Championship Game, and a bid to play in the College Football Playoff. The Tigers were ranked No. 2 in the College Football Playoff rankings, and defeated No. 3 Notre Dame, 30–3, in the 2018 Cotton Bowl Classic. They advanced to the 2019 College Football Playoff National Championship game, where they defeated Alabama, 44–16, handing the Crimson Tide their worst loss of the Nick Saban era. Lawrence was named Offensive MVP of the game and became the first true freshman quarterback to start for a national champion since Jamelle Holieway in 1985 for Oklahoma.

Lawrence threw for 3,280 passing yards and 30 touchdowns on the season, and was awarded the National Freshman of the Year and Archie Griffin Award by the Touchdown Club of Columbus. He was also awarded ACC Rookie of the Year honors.

Sophomore year

Returning for his sophomore year with the Tigers, Lawrence was named preseason ACC Player of the Year and was considered a leading candidate for the Heisman Trophy. Relatively inconsistent play in the early part of the season all but lost Lawrence the Heisman Trophy race, but he led FBS in passer rating over the final half of the regular season and ended seventh in Heisman Trophy voting. Lawrence helped lead Clemson to an undefeated regular season and an ACC Championship Game victory over Virginia, which gave them the No. 3 ranking in the final College Football Playoff rankings. In the 2019 Fiesta Bowl against Ohio State, he had 259 passing yards and two touchdowns to go along with 16 rushes for 107 yards and a touchdown in the 29–23 victory that brought them to the national championship game for the second consecutive year. Lawrence lost the first game of his career in the CFP Championship Game against LSU, as Clemson snapped its 29-game winning streak and lost 42–25. Lawrence posted the worst passer rating of his career as he only completed 18 of 37 passes for 234 yards and zero passing touchdowns in the game.

Junior year

Lawrence returned for his junior season with the Tigers. In his first six games of the season, Lawrence threw for 1,833 passing yards with 17 touchdowns and two interceptions. On October 30, 2020, Lawrence tested positive for COVID-19, which resulted in a 10-day quarantine, per ACC protocols. As a result, he missed two games before returning. Clemson lost one of those two games, to Notre Dame. After Lawrence returned to the team, he helped guide the Tigers back to the ACC Championship Game by finishing in second in the division-less format adopted for the 2020 season. They defeated Notre Dame in the rematch in the conference title game with Lawrence starting at quarterback, and were selected to a spot in the College Football Playoff. In the CFP semi-final, the Sugar Bowl, Lawrence and the Tigers lost to Ohio State.

Lawrence finished his final season with the Tigers 231-of-334 for 3,153 passing yards with 24 touchdowns and five interceptions. He was named ACC Player of the Year, and finished in second in voting for the Heisman Trophy behind Alabama wide receiver DeVonta Smith. After the season, Lawrence would be the men's recipient of the ACC Athlete of the Year award across all conference sports, sharing honors with women's recipient Charlotte North of Boston College lacrosse.

Collegiate statistics

Professional career

One of the NFL's highest-regarded amateur prospects, Lawrence was nearly unanimously projected to be taken first overall in the 2021 NFL Draft. Lawrence drew comparisons to Pro Football Hall of Fame quarterbacks John Elway and Peyton Manning and 2012 first overall pick Andrew Luck, with the slogan "Tank for Trevor" gaining popularity among fans of struggling teams. ESPN Mel Kiper Jr. ranked Lawrence as the fourth highest-graded quarterback he evaluated behind Elway, Luck, and Manning.

After undergoing surgery to repair a torn labrum in his left shoulder, Lawrence was officially selected first overall by the Jacksonville Jaguars, who finished with a league-worst 1–15 record the previous season. He signed his four-year rookie contract, worth $36.8 million that included a $24.1 million signing bonus, on July 5, 2021.

2021

Ahead of the final week of preseason, Lawrence was named the Jaguars' starting quarterback for 2021. Making his NFL debut against the Houston Texans, he finished with 332 passing yards, three touchdowns, and three interceptions in a 37–21 defeat. The loss was Lawrence's first in a regular season game. In his second game against the Denver Broncos, he threw a touchdown pass on the opening drive, but completed only eight of 25 passes afterwards and was intercepted twice as the Jaguars lost 23–13. Lawrence had a stronger performance when he faced the Cincinnati Bengals in the Week 4 Thursday Night Football matchup, which also pitted him against fellow first overall pick and 2020 National Championship Game opponent Joe Burrow. He completed 17 of 24 passes for 204 yards and scored his first rushing touchdown, also making it his first NFL game without an interception. Despite his efforts, the Jaguars lost 24–21.

Lawrence won his first NFL game in Week 6 against the Miami Dolphins, throwing for 319 yards and a touchdown during the 23–20 victory. Having played the game at Tottenham Hotspur Stadium, he became the first NFL rookie to win in London. The victory was also the Jaguars' first since Week 1 of the 2020 season, ending a 20-game losing streak.

Following a 31–7 loss to the Seattle Seahawks, Lawrence took part in the season's biggest upset when he helped the 15.5-point underdog Jaguars defeat the Buffalo Bills 9–6. However, the victory began a stretch that saw Lawrence throw only two touchdown passes in nine games, including seven games without any touchdowns, while having eight interceptions. The Jaguars also went on an eight-game losing streak, dropping them to the league's worst record for a second consecutive year. Nevertheless, Lawrence concluded the season with his strongest performance in Week 18, completing 23 of 32 passes for 223 yards and two touchdowns to secure a 26–11 upset over the Indianapolis Colts. 
Lawrence finished second in rookie passing yards behind Mac Jones with 3,641, but also had a league-high 17 interceptions.

2022

After losing to the Washington Commanders in the season opener, Lawrence won his next two games against the Indianapolis Colts and Los Angeles Chargers, throwing for a combined 497 yards and five touchdowns. The latter also marked Lawrence's first road victory and earned him AFC Offensive Player of the Week. However, the Jaguars went on a five-game losing streak, during which Lawrence completed 57.8% of his passes for 1,068 yards, five touchdowns, and five interceptions. He also had two games without any touchdown passes. The losing streak ended with a Week 9 victory over the Las Vegas Raiders, which saw Lawrence help Jacksonville overcome a 20–10 halftime deficit to win 27–20.

Down 27–20 near the end of a Week 12 matchup with the Baltimore Ravens, Lawrence led a game-winning drive in the final two minutes to secure the 28–27 victory. In Week 14, Lawrence went 30-for-42 for 368 yards and four total touchdowns in a 36-22 win over the Titans, earning AFC Offensive Player of the Week. Lawrence had another comeback victory during Week 15, throwing for 321 yards, four touchdowns, and an interception against the Dallas Cowboys as the Jaguars overcame a 27–10 third quarter deficit to win 40–34 in overtime.

Lawrence won his next two games against the New York Jets and Houston Texans to bring the Jaguars record to 8–8. In the final week of the season against the Tennessee Titans to determine the AFC South, Lawerence completed 20-of-32 passes for 212 yards and 1 touchdown in the 20–16 win, clinching the Jaguars first division title since 2017.

Lawrence finished the regular season with notable improvement in numerous areas, improving his touchdown-to-interception ratio from 12–17 to 25–8, along with his passer rating from 71.9 to 95.2, and completing 66.3% of his passes for 4,113 yards.

In the Jaguars' Wild Card Game against the Los Angeles Chargers, Lawrence struggled mightily to begin the game, throwing three interceptions in the first quarter and four in the first half, becoming the first player to throw three interceptions in the first quarter of a playoff game as the Jaguars trailed 27–7 at halftime. After completing 10-of-24 passes for 77 yards and a passer rating of 24.5 in the first two quarters, Lawrence rebounded in the second half, completing 18-of-23 passes for 211 yards, three touchdowns, and a passer rating of 144.5 as the Jaguars overcame a 27-point deficit to win 31–30, marking the third largest comeback in playoff history. The next week against the Kansas City Chiefs in the Divisional Round, Lawrence completed 24-of-39 passes for 217 yards, a touchdown, and an interception in the 27–20 loss. It was the first loss Lawrence suffered on a Saturday in his football career.

On January 31, 2023, he was named to the 2023 Pro Bowl, as an alternate, replacing Patrick Mahomes, who would play in Super Bowl LVII.

NFL career statistics

Regular season

Postseason

Personal life
Lawrence is a Christian. He is noted for his long blond hair. On April 10, 2021, Lawrence married Marissa Mowry, whom he had been dating since high school. Lawrence's older brother, Chase, is a visual artist for whom Trevor has posed before.

In 2021, Lawrence, among other high-profile athletes and celebrities, was a paid spokesperson for FTX, a cryptocurrency exchange. In November 2022, FTX filed for bankruptcy, wiping out billions of dollars in customer funds. Lawrence, alongside other spokespeople, is currently being sued for promoting unregistered securities through a class-action lawsuit.

References

External links

 
 Jacksonville Jaguars profile
 Clemson Tigers profile
 

1999 births
Living people
All-American college football players
American Christians
American football quarterbacks
Clemson Tigers football players
Jacksonville Jaguars players
National Football League first-overall draft picks
People from Cartersville, Georgia
Players of American football from Georgia (U.S. state)
Players of American football from Knoxville, Tennessee
Sportspeople from Knoxville, Tennessee
Sportspeople from the Atlanta metropolitan area
American Conference Pro Bowl players